Sir Jeremiah Le Roy Harman (13 April 1930 – 6 March 2021) was an English barrister and High Court judge. His judicial service was marred by a series of gaffes and high-profile incidents, culminating in his resignation in 1998 after being subject severe criticism by the Court of Appeal for delays in handing down a judgment.

Early life
Harman was born in Kensington, London, the son of Sir Charles Harman and Helen Sarah Le Roy Lewis. Harman was educated at Eton College, before joining the Coldstream Guards and subsequently the Parachute Regiment. He was called to the bar at Lincoln's Inn in 1954. He was appointed a judge of the High Court's Chancery Division in 1982.

Judicial career
He was known for his comments which were taken to reinforce the popular public stereotype of judges being out of touch with everyday life. He claimed not to have heard of Oasis at the height of their fame in 1996, and not to be familiar with "Gazza" as the nickname for Paul Gascoigne in 1990 when he was the subject of media interest due to his performances at the 1990 World Cup.

When a female witness indicated that she preferred to be addressed as "Ms", Mr Justice Harman was reported to have said to her: "I've always thought there were only three kinds of women: wives, whores and mistresses."

In 1992 he tried to kick a taxi driver whom he mistook for a press photographer trying to take his briefcase.

Two of Harman's more notable decisions were:
 Cornhill Insurance plc v Improvement Services Ltd
 Breckland Group Holdings Ltd v London and Suffolk Properties
But he handed down a number of reported judicial decisions during his career.

Resignation
He resigned his position in 1998 after being subject to severe criticism by the Court of Appeal for not handing down a judgment until 20 months after the hearing. For the year 2000 he served as Treasurer of Lincoln's Inn.

Personal life
Harman married three times. He was married to Helen Gillian Wharton from 1955 to 1958. From 1960 to 1987 he was married to Erica Jane Bridgeman, daughter of Hon. Sir Maurice Bridgeman. They had two sons and one daughter.

In 1987 he married thirdly, Katharine Frances Goddard Pulay (died 2002), daughter of Rt. Hon. Sir Eric Sachs.

In 2021 Harman died in his home in Chelsea London, after suffering from cancer.

Arms

References

1930 births
20th-century English judges
People educated at Eton College
Knights Bachelor
Chancery Division judges
Members of Lincoln's Inn
2021 deaths
Coldstream Guards officers
People from Kensington